

Films

1966 in LGBT history
LGBT
1966
1966-related lists
1966